Klemen Bauer (born 9 January 1986 in Ljubljana, Slovenia) is a Slovenian biathlete.

Bauer represented Slovenia at the 2006 and 2010 Winter Olympics, where he finished 4th in the sprint event. At the 2012 World Championships, Bauer won the silver medal at the mixed relay, together with Andreja Mali, Teja Gregorin and Jakov Fak.

Biathlon results
All results are sourced from the International Biathlon Union.

Olympic Games
0 medals

*The mixed relay was added as an event in 2014.

World Championships
1 medal (1 silver)

*During Olympic seasons competitions are only held for those events not included in the Olympic program.
**The mixed relay was added as an event in 2005.

References

1986 births
Living people
Slovenian male biathletes
Biathletes at the 2006 Winter Olympics
Biathletes at the 2010 Winter Olympics
Biathletes at the 2014 Winter Olympics
Biathletes at the 2018 Winter Olympics
Olympic biathletes of Slovenia
Sportspeople from Ljubljana
Biathlon World Championships medalists
21st-century Slovenian people